Karen Anne Phillips (born 4 May 1966), known after marriage as Karen Anne Higgison, was an Australian butterfly and individual medley swimmer of the 1980s, who won the silver medal in the 200-metre butterfly at the 1984 Summer Olympics in Los Angeles.

Raised in Nowra, New South Wales, Phillips was selected to represent Australia in the 200-metre butterfly and 400-metre individual medley, but was not expected to do well, barely scraping into the final of the 200-metre butterfly, and narrowly missing the final of the 400-metre individual medley.  Although she was left far behind by the United States' Mary T. Meagher, she swum a personal best of 2 minutes 10.56 seconds to claim the silver medal, although Meagher was 7 metres ahead.

Two years later at the 1986 Commonwealth Games in Edinburgh, Scotland, Phillips enjoyed more success, winning the silver medal in the 200-metre butterfly and bronze medal in the 4 x 100 metre medley relay.

She was the inaugural winner of the Australian Institute of Sport Athlete of the Year in 1983–84.

See also
 List of Olympic medalists in swimming (women)

References

Bibliography

External links
 Profile

1966 births
Living people
Olympic swimmers of Australia
Olympic silver medalists for Australia
Australian female freestyle swimmers
Australian female medley swimmers
Sportswomen from New South Wales
Australian Institute of Sport swimmers
Swimmers at the 1984 Summer Olympics
Swimmers at the 1986 Commonwealth Games
Commonwealth Games silver medallists for Australia
People from Nowra
Medalists at the 1984 Summer Olympics
Olympic silver medalists in swimming
Commonwealth Games medallists in swimming
20th-century Australian women
Medallists at the 1986 Commonwealth Games